The open back rounded vowel, or low back rounded vowel, is a type of vowel sound, used in some spoken languages. It is called Latin turned alpha being a rotated version of Latin alpha. It seems a "turned script a", being a rotated version of "script (cursive) a", which is the variant of a that lacks the extra stroke on top of a "printed a".

Features

Occurrence

See also
 Turned a
 Index of phonetics articles

Notes

References

External links
 

Open vowels
Back vowels
Rounded vowels